Geoff McClure (1950 – 15 March 2010) was an Australian sports journalist.

McClure moved from Broken Hill to work for the Melbourne afternoon newspaper The Herald in 1969. In the early 1970s, he worked for the British Daily Express newspaper.

McClure barracked for Carlton Football Club.

References

1950 births
2010 deaths
Australian journalists